The Twin Buttes are two volcanic cinder cones located in the Cascade Mountain Range in Shasta County, California. The volcanoes are part of the Bidwell Spring chain and lie within a region that was a hotbed of Quaternary volcanic activity. These lava flows are made of basalt and dacite; the volcanoes also erupted cinder and volcanic ash that reached eastward. The volcanoes were still monitored by the United States Geological Survey for deformation, an indicator of pre-eruptive activity, as of 2012, but they are considered to have "low to very low" threat potential for future eruptive activity.

Geography 

The Twin Buttes are two cinder cone volcanoes that lie north of Lassen Peak in Shasta County, California. Nearby towns include Burney, Old Station, and Viola. About 6,700 people live within  of the volcanoes, though the population within  climbs to more than 260,000. The buttes are aligned north–northwest and lie at the center of the Bidwell Spring volcanic chain.

Geology 

The Twin Buttes — and other volcanoes near Lassen Peak — are part of the Cascade Volcanic Arc, the product of subduction of the oceanic Juan de Fuca tectonic plate under the North American tectonic plate. Volcanic activity is also influenced by the westward expansion of the Basin and Range Province into the Cascades. Volcanism in the region encompasses a wide variety of eruption types, ranging from cinder cones to shield volcanoes. Eruptive activity has for the most part produced overlapping, mafic volcanoes through nonexplosive to weak explosive eruptions. Volcanic activity during the Quaternary has consisted of basalt, basaltic andesite, and olivine tholeiite. Other major volcanic centers near the Twin Buttes include the Yana, Maidu, Dittmar, and Latour centers, which were long-lived volcanic systems with magma ranging in composition from andesite to silicic rhyolite; these four systems are now eroded with extinct hydrothermal systems.

The Bidwell Spring chain consists of five eruptive units including the Twin Buttes basalt. 40Ar/39Ar has placed two other deposits, basaltic andesite from Black Butte and andesite from Bidwell Spring, at 62,000 ± 10,000 years old and 68,000 ± 6,000 years old, respectively. These determinations suggest several small eruptions between 65,000 and 45,000 years ago from the Bidwell Spring chain. Two other basaltic andesite deposits from the chain have been described by the United States Geological Survey (USGS), which considers the Bidwell Spring chain as part of the Caribou Volcanic Field, a system of 11 eruptive sequences between 200,000 and 100,000 years ago with vents aligned with faults that focused surface volcanic activity. Basalt from the Twin Buttes overlies eruptive material from the Poison Lake Chain and the Cone Lake Chain, which are also within the Caribou Volcanic field. Twin Buttes basalt is overlain by basaltic andesite erupted during the late Pleistocene from an unnamed volcanic vent, which is thought to be between 45,000 and 25,000 years old.

Subfeatures 

Other nearby features include basaltic andesite and a distinct basalt deposit southeast and northeast of the Twin Buttes, respectively, both of which were produced by eruptive activity between 50,000 and 35,000 years ago.

Eruptive history 
Located in a hotbed of Quaternary volcanic activity, the Twin Buttes volcanoes formed during the late Pleistocene. Eruptive material consisted of basalt (including picrite basalt) and dacite. The lava flows from the Twin Buttes are porphyritic with about 53% silica content; they have vesicular surfaces and dense interiors. Cinder and volcanic ash erupted by the Twin Buttes extend to the east.

While Twin Buttes last erupted during the late Pleistocene, the area is still monitored by the USGS given its proximity to Lassen Peak. As of 2012, there were three GPS receivers continuously monitoring Twin Buttes for deformation, an indicator of pre-eruptive activity. In 2014, the USGS considered Twin Buttes to have "low to very low" threat potential for a future eruption.

See also
 List of volcanoes in the United States

Notes 

 [b]  The Global Volcanism Program lists Twin Buttes as a Pleistocene volcano. Archived materials published by the United States Geological Survey lists it as late Pleistocene or early Holocene.

References

Sources 

Volcanoes of California
Cascade Volcanoes
Subduction volcanoes
Cinder cones of the United States
Cascade Range
Volcanoes of Shasta County, California
Pleistocene volcanoes